At over an hour's duration, Dvořák's String Quartet No. 3 in D major B. 18 is the longest of his compositions for this medium.  It was written early in his career, probably at some stage in the years 1869 and 1870. In addition to its length, its style has been described in parts as Wagnerian.

Background

The String Quartet No. 3 was one of three (Nos. 2, 3, and 4) which Dvořák believed he had destroyed after he had disposed of the scores, they having been written early in his composing career. The exact date of this one cannot be ascertained, but all three were composed during the years 1868 to 1870, with the completion of No. 4 given as December 1870. At a later stage the separate parts for the individual players were re-discovered and these quartets rescued for posterity. This quartet appears not to have been published commercially, but it appears in the Souborné vydání díla (complete critical edition), volume 5, dated 1964.

It received its first performance by the Dvorak Quartet, at the Rudolfinium, Prague, on 12 January 1969.

Structure

String Quartet No. 3 in D major, B. 18 is in four movements, as follows:

Typical performances take between 65 and 70 minutes.

Recordings

According to one source, the first recording was in 1938, by the Lener (Lehner) Quartet, which may have been reissued on CD by Rockport Records, although this was unverifiable in October 2015. Another source indicates that this recording was of String Quartet No. 10 in E major (which was 'No. 3' based on the old-style numbering). This would suggest that the first recording was in 1976 by the Prague String Quartet for Deutsche Grammophon. Subsequent recordings have been made by the Stamic, Panocha, Vlach and Zemlinsky string quartets.

Notes

References

External links 
 English language version of page about Dvořák's String Quartet No 3 at a Czech site

Dvorak 03
Compositions in D major